Kaela Berg (born September 15, 1973) is an American politician serving in the Minnesota House of Representatives since 2021. A member of the Minnesota Democratic Farmer-Labor Party (DFL), Berg represents District 55B in the southern Twin Cities metropolitan area, which includes the city of Burnsville and parts of Dakota County, Minnesota.

Early life, education and career 
Berg earned an associate degree from Ricks College (now Brigham Young University–Idaho). 

Since 2003, Berg has been a flight attendant for Endeavor Air. Berg has also worked as a union organizer and representative. She worked as a union steward for United Steelworkers and the Association of Flight Attendants, and as director of the Minnesota Fair Trade coalition.

Berg was a delegate to the 2016 Democratic National Convention for Bernie Sanders, and was critical of Hillary Clinton, stating "she has blood on her hands." Berg voted for Clinton after Sanders urged delegates to support Clinton to ensure Donald Trump would be defeated.

Minnesota House of Representatives 
Berg was elected to the Minnesota House of Representatives in 2020 and was reelected in 2022. She first ran after one-term DFL incumbent Alice Mann announced she would not seek reelection. In the general election, Berg defeated former Republican state representative Roz Peterson, who represented the district prior to Mann. In 2020, Berg had her election results challenged, however the case was dismissed by a judge for failing to state a claim and a lack of subject-matter jurisdiction.

Berg is the vice chair of the Labor and Industry Finance and Policy Committee, and sits on the Education Policy and State and Local Government Finance and Policy Committees. Berg also serves as an assistant majority leader for the DFL House Caucus. 

Berg is a member of the Reproductive Freedom Caucus, and is pro-choice. In February of 2022 in response to high gas prices, Berg joined other DFL legislators advocating for a temporary repeal of the state gas tax.

Electoral history

Personal life 
Berg lives in Burnsville, Minnesota and has two children.

References

External links 

 Official House of Representatives website
 Official campaign website

Living people
Brigham Young University–Idaho alumni
Democratic Party members of the Minnesota House of Representatives
Women state legislators in Minnesota
Flight attendants
1973 births